Connecticut Transit Hartford (CTtransit Hartford Division) is the largest division of Connecticut Transit, providing service on 43 local routes, 5 "flyer" limited stop routes and 18 express routes throughout 27 towns in Hartford County, including Bloomfield, East Hartford, Farmington, Glastonbury, Manchester, Middletown, Newington, New Britain, Rocky Hill, South Windsor, West Hartford, Wethersfield and Windsor, in addition to Hartford. Service is provided seven days a week in the region, with routes centered on Hartford. The Hartford Division provides connections with local routes in Bristol and New Britain. 

Since 1979, the Hartford, New Haven and Stamford divisions of CTtransit have been operated by First Transit.

Routes
For CTfastrak Routes 101-161 and Express Routes 923-925 & 928, see the CTfastrak page.

Express Routes
All routes in the CTtransit system, regardless of the operator, are numbered 901-999

Former Express Routes

Local routes
All local CTtransit buses in the Hartford area, except for Routes 91 and 92, ,start or end in Downtown Hartford.

Other routes

See also
Connecticut Transit New Britain and Bristol
Connecticut Transit New Haven
Connecticut Transit Stamford
Northeast Transportation Company

All of the above provide CTtransit route service.

References

External links
CTtransit Hartford Bus Routes
CT Dept. of Transportation: Local Bus Service

Hartford, Connecticut
Bus transportation in Connecticut